The Youth Party – European Greens (SMS-Zeleni) is a green political party in Slovenia. It is led by Igor Jurišič. Until July 2009, it was called Youth Party of Slovenia (SMS).

At the early 2011 Slovenian parliamentary election on 4 December 2011, the party won 0.86% of the vote, thus not gaining any seat in the National Assembly. In the 2008 election, the Youth Party ran a joint list with the Slovenian People's Party. The joint list secured 5 seats on 5.2% of the vote. At the parliamentary elections on 3 October 2004, the party won 2.1% of the popular vote and no seats. At the 2000 elections, the party won 4.34% of the vote and 4 seats.

Established 4 July 2000, by those dissatisfied with the political situation at the time, the Youth Party of Slovenia sought to regenerate politics within the country. Traditionally, the youth in Slovenia have been unresponsive to political issues and though the party strongly encourages young people to get involved it considers itself a party for anyone who desires a fresh and spirited approach to politics in Slovenia. The party is a member of the European Green Party.

Electoral results

National Assembly
Parliamentary representation:

Presidential

See also 
Green party
Green politics
List of environmental organizations

External links
Official web site

References

2000 establishments in Slovenia
European Green Party
Global Greens member parties
Green liberalism
Green parties in Europe
Organizations based in Ljubljana
Political parties established in 2000
Political parties in Slovenia
Political youth organizations